Ghazala Khan may refer to:

Honour killing of Ghazala Khan (1987–2005), Danish woman who was shot and killed in Denmark by her brother after she married against the will of the family
Khizr and Ghazala Khan, parents of United States Army Captain Humayun Khan, who was killed in 2004 during the Iraq War